The Men's Roller Derby Association (MRDA) is the international governing body of men's flat track roller derby. It was founded in 2007 under the name Men's Derby Coalition (renamed to Men's Roller Derby Association in 2011), and currently has 59 open gender leagues under its jurisdiction. MRDA member leagues play using the rules of Flat-Track Roller Derby originally designed by the WFTDA.

Member leagues 
The association has 59 active member leagues:

Inactive Leagues:

Championships
The MRDA-organized annual championships:

The Men's Derby Coalition (the MRDA's former name) held its first Championship on 17 October 2010, with New York Shock Exchange defeating the Pioneer Valley Dirty Dozen in the final.  

The second installment (and the first to be held under the MRDA name) was held on 22 October 2011 and featured the six top-ranked men's leagues. New York Shock Exchange managed to defend their title with a narrow win over Puget Sound Outcast Derby.

At the 2012 Championships, Your Mom Men's Derby beat St. Louis by a single point (136–135) in the final, despite having trailed for almost the entire bout. 

Your Mom Men's Derby won again at the 2013 tournament by a larger margin, beating New York 249 to 130 in the final. Your Mom Men's Derby went on to win the 2014 final by beating St. Louis GateKeepers. 

The 2015 Championship was especially notable, as it was the first time a team from outside the USA participated (Southern Discomfort Roller Derby from London, England, UK). The final once again saw Your Mom Men's Derby vs. the St. Louis GateKeepers. The GateKeepers won by a score of 188 to 121.

The St. Louis Gatekeepers kept up the momentum and won the MRDA Championship title four more times: 2016 (againt Your Mom Men's Roller Derby 165-129), 2017 (against Bridgetown Menace 181-156), 2018 (again, against Bridgetown Menace 162–150), and 2019 (against the Magic City Misfits 154-117). 2018 the first year a team from outside the USA (Roller Derby Toulouse) won Bronze at the Championships.

Because of the COVID-19 pandemic, the MRDA has suspended post-season activity since 2020.

References

External links 

Men's roller derby
Sports organizations established in 2007